The 1915 Prince Edward Island general election was held in the Canadian province of Prince Edward Island on September 16, 1915. The election was held in the midst of the First World War.

The election was won by the governing Conservatives, led by incumbent Premier John A. Mathieson, whose government lost a large number of seats as the opposition Liberals won back a number of districts lost in previous elections.

The Liberals in this election were able to climb up from one of their worst electoral defeats in 1912 to nearly topple the Mathieson government. However, it is unknown who the Liberal leader was during the election, if there was one at all. Previous Official Opposition Leader John Richards chose not to run in this election, while his successor John Howatt Bell was chosen as leader following the election. It is possible the Liberals did not have an official leader for this election.

Party Standings

Members Elected

The Legislature of Prince Edward Island had two levels of membership from 1893 to 1996 - Assemblymen and Councillors. This was a holdover from when the Island had a bicameral legislature, the General Assembly and the Legislative Council.

In 1893, the Legislative Council was abolished and had its membership merged with the Assembly, though the two titles remained separate and were elected by different electoral franchises. Assembleymen were elected by all eligible voters of within a district, while Councillors were only elected by landowners within a district.

Kings

Queens

Prince

 John Howatt Bell named Leader of the Official Opposition and Liberal Party Leader following the election

Sources

Further reading
 

1915 elections in Canada
Elections in Prince Edward Island
1915 in Prince Edward Island
September 1915 events